Gaston-Pierre-Charles de Lévis-Lomagne, duc de Mirepoix (1699–1757), maréchal de France (1757) and Ambassador of Louis XV, was a French aristocrat. His family was established in Languedoc as Seigneurs of Mirepoix, Ariège since the 11th century.

His chef de cuisine established the sautéed three vegetables that served as a basis for his culinary art, as a mirepoix in honor of his patron.

According to Pierre Larousse (quoted in the Oxford Companion to Food), the unfortunate Duke of Mirepoix was "an incompetent and mediocre individual... who owed his vast fortune to the affection Louis XV felt toward his wife and who had but one claim to fame: he gave his name to a sauce made of all kinds of meat and a variety of seasonings".

See also
 House of Lévis
 French Ambassadors to Great Britain

External links
 Annuaire de la Pairie et de la noblesse de France et des maisons souveraines de l'Europe (1843–54)

1699 births
1757 deaths
Marshals of France
Gaston Pierre
18th-century French diplomats
Knights of Malta